The Indochinese cuckooshrike (Lalage polioptera) is a species of bird in the family Campephagidae.  It is found in Cambodia, Laos, Myanmar, Thailand, and Vietnam.  Its natural habitats are subtropical or tropical moist lowland forest and subtropical or tropical moist montane forest.

References

Indochinese cuckooshrike
Birds of Southeast Asia
Indochinese cuckooshrike
Taxonomy articles created by Polbot